= Baitul Jaamay Mosque =

Mosque in Illinois, United States

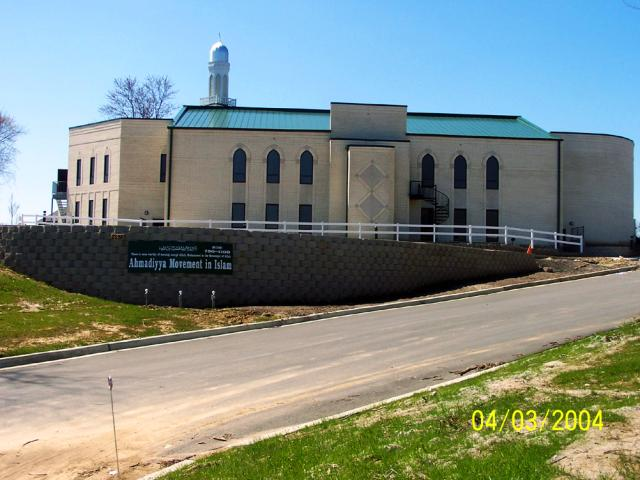

Religion
- Affiliation: Islam
- Branch/tradition: Ahmadiyya

Location
- Location: Glen Ellyn, United States
- Interactive map of Baitul Jaamay Mosque
- Coordinates: 41°50′08″N 88°03′18″W

Architecture
- Type: Mosque
- Completed: 2003

Specifications
- Dome: 0
- Minaret: 1

Baitul Jaamay Mosque is an Ahmadi Muslim mosque in Glen Ellyn, DuPage County, in the US state of Illinois.
